Robert B. Clark Jr. (February 12, 1930 – December 13, 2004) was an American football player and coach. He was the head coach at Washington State University for four seasons, from 1964 through 1967.

Early life and playing career
Born in Wichita Falls, Texas, Clark graduated from high school in 1948 and played college football at the University of Oklahoma under  coach Bud Wilkinson. He lettered three seasons from 1949 to 1951, as the Sooners posted records of   Clark was a two-time All Big Eight Conference linebacker and helped the 1950 Sooners capture a national title.

After a brief stint with the Dallas Texas of the National Football League (NFL) in 1952 and a season with the Calgary Stampeders of the Canadian Football League (CFL) in 1953, Clark served in the United States Army.

Assistant coach
Following his military service, he was an assistant coach for a season at the University of Arkansas in 1956 under former Sooner Jack Mitchell, and then joined the staff of first-year head coach Jim Owens at the University of Washington in Seattle in 1957. Owens and Clark were teammates at Oklahoma in their undefeated 1949 season.

Washington State
After seven seasons in Seattle with Owens at Washington, he was hired as head coach at Washington State in Pullman in January 1964; his initial contract was a three-year deal for $16,500 per year.

On the Palouse, he was near another former 1949 Sooner teammate, Dee Andros, who was in his third (and final) season as head coach of the Idaho Vandals,  to the east. Clark's first WSU team lost both rivalry games, expectedly to Washington in the Apple Cup, but unexpectedly to Idaho  in the Battle of the Palouse, the Vandals' first win the over the Cougars in a decade.

His 1965 team was nicknamed "The Cardiac Kids" for their dramatic late-game comebacks against Iowa, Minnesota, Villanova, Indiana, and Oregon State. It was also the only team in school history to defeat three Big Ten teams (Iowa, Minnesota, Indiana). It was the first time the Cougars had lost two straight to the Vandals in forty years, done before a record-breaking crowd of 22,600 at Rogers Field.

Following the 1965 season, Clark signed a new three-year contract, at $19,700 per year. Expectations were high for 1966, but the Cougars were 3–7 and nearly lost to Idaho for a third straight year in a sloppy mudbath at Neale Stadium in Moscow. Two fourth-quarter WSU touchdowns, one on a fumble return and another on a long run from scrimmage after a Vandal fumble saved the day for the Cougars, 14–7.

Clark was fired in late November, with a season remaining on his contract.

After Pullman
Clark coached at the University of New Mexico in 1968 as defensive coordinator to first-time head coach Rudy Feldman, and went to the CFL in 1970 with the Winnipeg Blue Bombers under new head coach Jim Spavital. He later went into the investment business in Texas in Dallas and Galveston.

Clark died in Katy, Texas in December 2004 at the age of 74 and was buried at Sacred Heart Cemetery in Wichita Falls.

Head coaching record

References

1930 births
2004 deaths

American football centers
American football linebackers
American players of Canadian football
Arkansas Razorbacks football coaches
Calgary Stampeders players
Dallas Texans (NFL) players
New Mexico Lobos football coaches
Oklahoma Sooners football players
Washington Huskies football coaches
Washington State Cougars football coaches
Winnipeg Blue Bombers coaches
People from Wichita Falls, Texas
Coaches of American football from Texas
Players of American football from Texas